Raceway may refer to:

Sporting venues
 Raceway, a race track, where sporting races are run or operated, such as:
 Roosevelt Raceway, a former race track in Westbury, New York
 Yonkers Raceway, a racino in Yonkers, New York

Arts, entertainment, and media 
 "Raceway, a song by Def Leppard on Kings of Oblivion (1973)
 "Raceway", a song by the Pink Fairies

Other uses
 Raceway (aquaculture), a tank providing a flow-through system to support a higher density of animals for seafood
 Raceway, surface mounted wire moulding in construction projects
 Raceway, a mill race; the current or channel of a stream
 Raceway, a brand of gasoline stations operated by RaceTrac contractors in the Southeastern United States

See also
 Raceway Park (disambiguation)
 Speedway (disambiguation)